Wriggler may refer to:

Collared wrigglers, fish in the family Xenisthmidae
Wriggler (mosquito larva), larvae of mosquitoes
Wriggler (video game), a computer game for the ZX Spectrum

See also
Wiggler (disambiguation)